Charles Boarman (1795–1879) was a United States Navy officer.

Charles Boarman may also refer to:

Charles Boarman (pioneer) (1828–1880), American pioneer and frontier physician
Charles Boarman Harris (1857–1942), American physician and surgeon

See also
Boarman
Charles R. Boardman (1860–1950), American journalist, businessman, and Army National Guard officer